Tarzan is an American adventure-drama television series that premiered on The WB on October 5, 2003, and ended on November 23, 2003. Based on the Tarzan series by Edgar Rice Burroughs and developed by Eric Kripke, Mike Werb and Michael Colleary, the show was set in New York City and depicted modern-day adaptations of Burroughs' characters. In December 2003, the series was canceled after eight episodes.

Synopsis and creator commentary
NYPD detective Jane Porter's ordinary life is disrupted when a routine case unexpectedly leads her to John Clayton, who prefers to be called Tarzan. After being proclaimed dead for 20 years, John Clayton was found in the jungles of Africa by his billionaire uncle, Richard Clayton, who is the CEO of powerful Greystoke Industries. Held against his will at his uncle's home, Tarzan escapes and prowls all over the city, helping others in need. Upon meeting Jane, he begins to follow her from her home to crime scenes, simultaneously assisting her with her police cases.

Kripke was critical of the show, calling it "a piece of crap" and saying: "I'll stand behind the pilot. It has a beginning, middle, and -- the problem -- it ends. I was hungry to have anything in production, so I wrote a 50-page story that ended. Then it got made and I had something in production, and it was all my dreams come true. They said to me, 'Let's do 12 more.' I said, 'Uh, wait! What's the story?' So, Tarzan was a hell ride in every way, and we only did eight before they wisely put us out of our misery."

Cast

Main
 Travis Fimmel as John Clayton Jr./Tarzan, heir & shareholder of Greystoke Industries
 Sarah Wayne Callies as Detective Jane Porter
 Miguel A. Núñez Jr. as Detective Sam Sullivan
 Leighton Meester as Nicki Porter, Jane's sister
 Mitch Pileggi as billionaire Richard Clayton, CEO & shareholder of Greystoke Industries and uncle of John Clayton Jr./Tarzan
 Lucy Lawless as Kathleen Clayton, newspaper publisher, shareholder of Greystoke Industries and aunt of John Clayton Jr./Tarzan

Recurring and guest stars
 Douglas O'Keeffe as Patrick Nash
 Johnny Messner as Detective Michael Foster
 Fulvio Cecere as Detective Gene Taylor
 Joe Grifasi as Lieutenant Scott Connor
 Tim Guinee as Donald Ingram
 James Carroll as Howard Rhinehart
 Marcus Chait as Gary Lang
 David Warshofsky as Sheriff Tim Sweeney

Episodes

List of songs used
The opening theme song is "Try" by Paloalto.

Reception
On Metacritic the show has a score of 45% based on reviews from 21 critics, indicating "mixed or average reviews".

References

External links
 

The WB original programming
2000s American drama television series
2000s American police procedural television series
2003 American television series debuts
2003 American television series endings
American adventure television series
English-language television shows
Fictional portrayals of the New York City Police Department
Tarzan television series
Television series by Warner Bros. Television Studios
Television shows set in New York City